Rahim Khan may refer to:

 Abdul Rahim Khan-I-Khana (1556–1627), Indian poet, writer and civil servant
 Rahim Khan of Ganja, ruler of the Ganja Khanate in 1786
 Abdur Rahim Khan (1925–1990), Pakistani general
 Rahim Khan, Iran, a village in West Azerbaijan Province, Iran
 Rahim Aga Khan (born 1971), eldest son of Prince Karim Aga Khan
 Rahim Khan (field hockey) (born 1971), Pakistan field hockey player
 Rahim Khan (politician) (born 1967), Indian politician in the Karnataka Legislative Assembly